Neocaristius heemstrai is a species of fish in the family Caristiidae, the manefishes. This species grows to a length of  SL.

This fish was first described in 2006 and was moved to a monotypic genus of its own, Neocaristius, in 2011.

Etymology
The fish is named in honor of Phillip C. Heemstra (1941-2019), of the J.L.B. Smith Institute of Ichthyology in Grahamstown, South Africa, for his contributions to the studies of marine fishes, and in 1986 was the first to draw attention to this species.

References

Caristiidae
Monotypic fish genera
Taxa named by Ivan Andreevich Trunov
Taxa named by Nikolai Vasilyevich Parin
Fish described in 2006